The 1909 Croydon by-election was held on 29 March 1909.  The by-election was held due to the death of the incumbent Liberal Unionist MP, H. O. Arnold-Forster.  It was won by the Conservative candidate Robert Hermon-Hodge.

References

Croydon
Croydon by-election
20th century in Surrey
Croydon,1909
Croydon,1909
Croydon,1909